Mike Woodley is a former American football coach. He served as the head football coach at St. Ambrose University in Davenport, Iowa from 1991 to 1993 and Grand View University in Des Moines, Iowa from the program's inception in 2008 through the 2018 season, compiling a career college football coaching record of 107–53. Woodley left Grand View in June 2019 to become the first head football coach at Mount Marty College in Yankton, South Dakota. He retired in August 2021 before Mount Marty played its first game.

At Grand View, Woodley coached his 2013 team to a NAIA Football National Championship title.  He was named the NAIA Football Coach of the Year Award that same season, voted the Mid-States Football Association Midwest League Coach of the Year in 2009, 2011, 2013, and 2014, and the Heart of America Conference Coach of the Year in 2015 and 2017. Woodley's coaching record with the Grand View Vikings was 93–35. His record with the St. Ambrose Fighting Bees was 14–18.

A four-year letter winner in football at the University of Northern Iowa, Woodley was a three-time all-conference first team player (1971–1973) and a second-team selection to the 1973 Little All-America college football team as a senior. The UNI Athletics Hall of Fame inducted Woodley in its Class of 2005.

As a high school football coach, Woodley coached in New Mexico, Iowa and Texas.

Head coaching record

College football

References

External links
 Mount Marty profile

Year of birth missing (living people)
Living people
American football safeties
Grand View Vikings football coaches
Iowa Hawkeyes football coaches
Iowa State Cyclones football coaches
Mount Marty Lancers football coaches
Northern Iowa Panthers football players
Northern Iowa Panthers men's basketball players
St. Ambrose Fighting Bees football coaches
High school baseball coaches in the United States
High school football coaches in Iowa
High school football coaches in New Mexico
High school football coaches in Texas
Sportspeople from Waterloo, Iowa
Coaches of American football from Iowa
Players of American football from Iowa
Baseball coaches from Iowa
Basketball players from Iowa